Deb A. Niemeier is an American transportation engineer known for her work on measuring vehicle emissions and its impact on the air quality in nearby neighborhoods, on the effects of carbon dioxide on climate change, on gender differences in commuting behavior, and on the quantification of transport accessibility. She is James & Alice B. Clark Distinguished Chair Professor of Civil and Environmental Engineering at the University of Maryland, College Park.

Education and career
Niemeier is originally from Texas, and majored in civil engineering at the University of Texas at Austin, graduating in 1982. After working as a consultant in Maine, she returned to graduate school at the University of Washington, where she completed a Ph.D. in 1994 under the supervision of Scott Rutherford.

She became a faculty member in civil engineering at the University of California, Davis, where her service included terms as department chair, Director of the John Muir Institute, Associate Vice Chancellor for Research, and editor-in-chief for the journals Sustainable Cities and Society and Transportation Research Part A. She moved from Davis to the University of Maryland as Clark Professor in 2019.

Recognition
Niemeier was named a Fellow of the American Association for the Advancement of Science in 2014 and a Guggenheim Fellow in 2015. In 2017, she was elected a member of the National Academy of Engineering "for developing groundbreaking tools to characterize the impact of transportation emissions on air quality and environmental justice". In 2021 she was elected to the American Philosophical Society.

References

External links
Home page

Year of birth missing (living people)
Living people
American civil engineers
American women engineers
Environmental engineers
Transport engineers
University of Texas at Austin alumni
University of California, Davis faculty
University of Maryland, College Park faculty
Fellows of the American Association for the Advancement of Science
Members of the United States National Academy of Engineering
Members of the American Philosophical Society
21st-century American women